Lumbriculus mukoensis was described by Yamaguchi in 1953 from specimens collected at Mukō in Hyōgo Prefecture, Japan. It is distinguished from other Lumbriculus by the posterior location of the genital elements (starting in segment XI), and by its smaller body size. It has been proposed as a subspecies of Lumbriculus variegatus.

References 

mukoensis